Alphonse Munyeshyaka is a Rwandan Olympic middle-distance runner. He represented his country in the men's 1500 meters at the 1996 Summer Olympics. His time was a 3:58.75.

References

1974 births
Living people
Rwandan male middle-distance runners
Olympic athletes of Rwanda
Athletes (track and field) at the 1992 Summer Olympics